is a theme park in Sasebo, Nagasaki, Japan, which recreates the Netherlands by displaying life-sized copies of old Dutch buildings. The name Huis Ten Bosch translates into English as "House at the Woods/Forest". It is named after Huis ten Bosch in The Hague, one of the three official residences of the Dutch Royal Family. The park features many Dutch-style buildings such as hotels, villas, theatres, museums, shops and restaurants, along with canals, windmills, amusement rides, and a park planted in seasonal flowers.

Overview

Huis Ten Bosch, which opened on 25 March 1992, is located around 12 km southeast of Sasebo. It is on Hario Island, essentially an area of reclaimed marshland on the main coastline of Kyushu facing Ōmura Bay. Its location in this area of the country reflects the historical relations between the Netherlands and Japan, which began in 1609 when a trading post was opened by the Dutch in Hirado, an island off the coast of Kyushu around 35 km northwest of central Sasebo.

Huis Ten Bosch is open daily from 9.00 a.m. to 9.30 p.m. (9.00 a.m. to 8.30 p.m. from December to February). Huis Ten Bosch Station, operated by the Kyushu Railway Company, serves as the station for trains arriving from either Nagasaki or Sasebo. The park can also be reached by boat from Nagasaki Airport or Sasebo via Huis Ten Bosch Marina and Harbour.

The park recorded the peak of 4.25 million visitors in 1996. However, due to the fall of the number of visitors caused by economic slump in Japan, the park declared bankruptcy in 2003 with debt of  billion. The rebuilding plan was sponsored by Nomura Principal Finance Company until March 2010, when H.I.S., a travel agency, took over the management by injecting  billion.

In 2015, the  opened at the park. It is officially recognized by the Guinness World Records as the first robot-staffed hotel.

References

External links

 

Tourist attractions in Nagasaki Prefecture
Buildings and structures in Nagasaki Prefecture
Amusement parks opened in 1992
Amusement parks in Japan
1992 establishments in Japan
2022 mergers and acquisitions
Sasebo